"Escape Plan" is a song by American rapper and singer Travis Scott. It was released on November 5, 2021, concurrently with another single, "Mafia", which are both a part of a conjoined single titled Escape Plan / Mafia. The song was produced by Oz and Nik D.

Background
On June 24, 2021, Spotify previewed a snippet of "Escape Plan" in an advertisement for the company. Exactly one month later, on July 24, 2021, Scott previewed a snippet of the song and its music video and performed a portion of it at Rolling Loud in Miami, Florida, that same night. On October 30, 2021, Scott performed the song again at Rolling Loud, this time in Brooklyn, New York, also previewing a new and extended verse. Scott announced the release of new music on November 4, 2021, the day before "Escape Plan" and "Mafia" were released.

Music video
A music video for "Escape Plan" premiered on November 5, 2021, twelve hours after the release of the song. It was directed by Scott himself alongside Tyler Ross and Eliel Ford. The video starts with Scott listening to the song in his car. He then raps the song from the top of a hill with a security team and guard dogs surrounding him. The next scene sees him taking a Louis Vuitton briefcase and going on a jet before riding an ATV and a motorboat. Finally, he goes with his friends to a party.

Credits and personnel
Credits adapted from Tidal.
 
 Travis Scott – vocals, songwriting, recording
 Oz – production, songwriting
 Nik D – production, songwriting
 Mike Dean – mixing, mastering
 Derek "206Derek" Anderson – recording

Charts

References

2021 singles
2021 songs
Travis Scott songs
Songs written by Travis Scott
Songs written by Oz (record producer)
Epic Records singles
Cactus Jack Records singles